Maurice Ostrer (1896–1975) was a British film executive. He was best known for overseeing the Gainsborough melodramas. He was head of production at Gainsborough Studios from 1943–46. He resigned from the studio in 1946 after a disagreement with J. Arthur Rank, who had taken over the studio.

Ostrer left the film industry and went to work in textiles.

According to writer Robert Murphy, "Maurice's subsequent disappearance from the film industry... makes it easy to dismiss him as a dilettante whose success owed more to luck than judgement. The break-up of the partnership with [producer Ted] Black was unfortunate and Gainsborough became severely debilitated in terms of acting, writing and directing talent. But of the ten films Maurice Ostrer was directly responsible for, seven were big box-office successes and his vision of an efficiently run studio dedicated to medium budget entertainment films with the emphasis on a particular genre was unique and it was to provide a model for Hammer a decade later."

Select credits

As Head of Production at Gainsborough
Ask a Policeman (1939)
A Girl Must Live (1939)
Where's That Fire? (1939)
The Frozen Limits (1939)
Inspector Hornleigh on Holiday (1939) 
Band Waggon (1940)
They Came by Night (1940)
For Freedom (1940)
Charley's (Big-Hearted) Aunt (1940)
Night Train to Munich (1940)
Girl in the News (1940)
Gasbags (1940)
Neutral Port (1940)
The Ghost Train (1941)
Inspector Hornleigh Goes To It (1941)
Kipps (1941)
Once a Crook (1941)
Cottage to Let (1941)
I Thank You (1941)
Hi Gang! (1941)
Back-Room Boy (1942)
The Young Mr. Pitt (1942)
Uncensored (1942)
King Arthur Was a Gentleman(1942)
It's That Man Again (1943)
We Dive at Dawn (1943)
Miss London Ltd (1943)
The Man in Grey (1943)
Dear Octopus (1943)
Millions Like Us (1943)
Time Flies (1944)
Bees in Paradise (1944)
Fanny By Gaslight (1944)
Give Us the Moon (1944)
Two Thousand Women (1944)
Love Story (1944)
Madonna of the Seven Moons (1944)
Victory Wedding (1944)
Waterloo Road (1945)
A Place of One's Own (1945)
They Were Sisters (1945)
I'll Be Your Sweetheart (1945)
The Wicked Lady (1945)
Caravan (1946)
The Magic Bow (1946)
The Root of All Evil (1947)

Executive Producer
Love Story (1944)
Madonna of the Seven Moons (1944)
A Place of One's Own (1944)
They Were Sisters (1945)
I'll Be Your Sweetheart (1945)
The Wicked Lady (1945)
The Magic Bow (1946)
Caravan (1946)
The Root of All Evil (1947)
Idol of Paris (1948)

References

Notes

External links

Maurice Ostrer at BFI Screenonline
Maurice Ostrer at Britmovie

1896 births
1975 deaths
British film producers